
Gmina Domaniów is a rural gmina (administrative district) in Oława County, Lower Silesian Voivodeship, in south-western Poland.

It is part of the larger Wrocław metropolitan area.

Neighbouring gminas
Gmina Domaniów is bordered by the gminas of Borów, Oława, Siechnice, Strzelin, Wiązów and Żórawina.

Villages
The gmina contains the villages of Brzezimierz, Chwastnica, Danielowice, Domaniów, Domaniówek, Gęsice, Gostkowice, Goszczyna, Grodziszowice, Janków, Kończyce, Kuchary, Kuny, Kurzątkowice, Pełczyce, Piskorzów, Piskorzówek, Polwica, Radłowice, Radoszkowice, Skrzypnik, Swojków, Teodorów, Wierzbno and Wyszkowice.

Twin towns – sister cities

Gmina Domaniów is twinned with:
 Hagenow-Land, Germany

References

Domaniow
Oława County